Frank Henry Charters (17 January 1884 – 25 January 1953) was an English cricketer. Charters was a right-handed batsman.

Charters represented Hampshire in one first-class match in 1913 against Derbyshire.

In 1920 Charters represented the Surrey Second XI in two Minor Counties Championship matches against Glamorgan and the Kent Second XI

Charters died in Boscombe, Hampshire on 25 January 1953.

External links
Frank Charters at Cricinfo
Frank Charters at CricketArchive

1884 births
1953 deaths
Cricketers from Plymouth, Devon
English cricketers
Hampshire cricketers